Little Allen Lake is a lake in the municipality of Dysart et al, Haliburton County in Central Ontario, Canada. It is the source of Allen Creek and is in the Ottawa River drainage basin.

Geography
The lake is at the height of land between the Ottawa River drainage basin to the north and east, and the Trent River drainage basin to the west and south. The nearest named community is Pusey,  to the south and just over the border into the neighbouring municipality of Highlands East.

The lake has no inflows. The primary outflow, at the northern end of the lake, is Allen Creek, which flows via Benoir Lake, the York River and the Madawaska River to the Ottawa River.

References

Lakes of Haliburton County